This is a list of television programmes formerly or currently broadcast by Comedy Central and Comedy Central Extra in the United Kingdom and Ireland.

Current programmes
Beavis and Butt-Head (original series) (2021-present) 
The Daily Show with Trevor Noah
Friends
Guessable
Last Man Standing
Impractical Jokers
My Wife and Kids
Ren & Stimpy (repeats since 25th August, 2022) 
Rhod Gilbert's Growing Pains
South Park (2005–present)

Former programmes

Former programming: 2015-2020
8 Out Of 10 Cats (broadcast rights with to E4/4Music)
The A-Team
Bad Education
Baywatch
Blockbusters
Bob's Burgers
Broad City
Chris Ramsey's Stand Up Central
Comedy Game Night (previously shown on Channel 5 as Celebrity Game Night)
The Complaints Department
The Cleveland Show (2019–present)
Daria
Da Ali G Show
Detroiters
Fresh Off The Boat
The Ricky Gervais Show
Legends of Chamberlain Heights
Life in Pieces
Lip Sync Battle
Live at the Apollo
Michael McIntyre's Big Show (also shown on 5Star)
The Middle
Nathan For You
Night Sweats
Roast Battle
Rob Beckett's Undeniable
Russell Howard's Good News (a similar show called The Russell Howard Hour is now broadcast by Sky)
Scrubs (broadcast rights moved to E4/E4 Extra) (now moved to Disney+)
Takeshi's Castle
Tosh.0
TripTank
Two and a Half Men
Workaholics
You’re the Worst (also shown on 5Star)
Your Face or Mine
Younger

Only on Comedy Central Extra
The Alternative Comedy Experience
Comedy Central At The Comedy Store
Drunk History
Idiotsitter
Inside Amy Schumer
Jackass
Lee Evans
Micky Flanagan: Back in the Game
Peter Kay At The Comedy Store (also shown on Channel 5)
Teachers
Everybody Loves Raymond
The King of Queens
Grimm
The Good Brothers

Former programming: 1995-2015

30 Rock
3rd Rock from the Sun
The Abbott and Costello Show
Al Murray - A Glass...
Al Murray - My Gaff, My Rules
Ally McBeal
Andromeda
Andy Richter Controls The Universe
Ardal O'Hanlan Live
Asylum
Bad Robots
Baddiel and Skinner Unplanned
Badly Dubbed Porn
Bang Bang It's Reeves & Mortimer
Barry Welsh is Coming
Beauty and the Beast
Beavis and Butt-Head
Becker
Big Bad World
Bill Bailey - Bewilderness
Bill Plympton's Shorts
Birds of a Feather
A Bit of Fry & Laurie
Black Books
Bless This House
Bordertown
Bram & Alice
Brickleberry
Brighton Chat Show
Brighton Gala
Brotherhood
Calvin and the Colonel
Caroline in the City
Celebrity Death Match
Cheers (Now on Channel 4)
Clueless
Comedy Blue
Comedy Store
The Comic Strip Presents...
Bad News Tour
The Bullshitters: Roll Out The Gunbarrel
Four Men In A Car
The Strike
The Yob
Coupling
Courting Alex
Cybill
Dan Doyle: Space Person(featuring Manga Entertainment series such as Dominion: Tank Police)
Das Crazy Clip Show
Dead Ringers
Desmonds
The Detectives
DiResta
Dirty Sanchez
Dirty Sexy Funny
Dom & Kirk's Night O' Plenty
Dr. Katz, Professional Therapist
Drawn Together
Drop the Dead Donkey
Duckman
Duty Free
Dylan Moran Live
Earth: Final Conflict
Edinburgh and Beyond
Epic Meal Empire
Eurotrash
Everybody Hates Chris
A Fistful...
Flipside TV
The Frank Skinner Show
Frasier
The Fresh Prince of Bel-Air
George and Mildred
Give Out Girls
Goodness Gracious Me
Grace Under Fire
Grosse Pointe
Grouchy Young Men
Grumpy Old Men
Grumpy Old Women
Happy Days 
Happy Tree Friends  
He's a Lady 
Hippies 
The Hitchhiker's Guide to the Galaxy
How To Be A Complete Sod
I Work Here
In Bed with Medinner
In-Laws
Ink 
It's Garry Shandling's Show
Jack Dee Live at the Apollo 
Jo Brand Barely Live
Jongleurs Unleashed 
Just For Laughs
Kate & Allie 
Keith Barret Live
The King of Queens 
Kitchen Confidential 
Kristin
Lee Evans:
Live from the West End
Live in Scotland
Wired & Wonderful
Less Than Perfect 
Linc's 
The Liver Birds
The Lordz o' Flys 
Lucas & Walliams - The Early Years
The Magician
MAD
Malcolm In The Middle 
Man About the House 
Married... with Children 
M*A*S*H 
Mash and Peas
May to December 
The Micallef Program
The Mighty Boosh
Mike & Molly
Minder 
A Minute with Stan Hooper
Modern Toss
Moesha
Monty Python's Flying Circus 
Moonlighting
More Bad News
Mork & Mindy
Mr. Bean 
Mr Jolly Lives Next Door
Murder Most Horrid
Mutant X
Naked and Funny
Ned & Stacey
Never Mind the Buzzcocks
The New Statesman
Night Stand with Dick Dietrick
The Nightly Show with Larry Wilmore
Not Going Out
Not the Nine O'Clock News
The Office (US)
People Like Us 
Phill Jupitus at the Comedy Store 
Phill Jupitus - Quadrophobia 
The Piglet Files
Pimp My Ride
Podge & Rodge... 
Police Squad!
Popeye and Son
Punk’d
Rab C. Nesbitt
Rendez-View
Respectable
Rex the Runt
Rhoda
Rick and Morty (now on E4)
Robin's Nest
Roseanne
Rules of Engagement
Samantha Who
The Sarah Silverman Program
Seinfeld 
Sex and the City
Sexy Cam 
Shane 
Sister Sister
skitHOUSE 
Sledge Hammer!
Soap 
Spin City 
Spitting Image
SpongeBob SquarePants
Stacked 
Suburban Shootout
Taxi
Terry and June
That '70s Show
Threesome
Three's Company
Time Gentlemen Please
Tommy Tiernan Live
Trailer Park Boys
Two Pints of Lager and a Packet of Crisps
(Un)natural Acts
The Save-Ums!
The Upper Hand
Veronica's Closet
Vic Reeves Big Night Out
We Know Where You Live ...
Whose Line is it Anyway?
Whitney
Wings
The Wonder Years
The World Stands Up
World's Craziest Fools
The Young Ones
You've Been Maimed

References

Lists of television series by network
British television-related lists